Ana Rute Campos Costa (born 1 June 1994) is a Portuguese footballer who plays as a goalkeeper for Benfica of the Campeonato Nacional de Futebol Feminino.

Career

Club
Costa started his career at Portuguese Second Division's team Casa do Povo de Martim. In 2012, she moved to First Division's club Boavista. Two years later, she signed with Clube de Albergaria where she stayed for two seasons until 2016, when Costa signed with S.C. Braga. Costa was voted the 2017–18 Campeonato Nacional de Futebol Feminino Goalkeeper of the Season in June 2018.

International
Costa represented Portugal at several levels, starting on 15 March 2012 in a 2-1 defeat against Wales U19 team. She also played for the Portuguese women's beach soccer team. On 19 January 2017 Costa debuted for the Portugal senior team in a 1-0 defeat against Northern Ireland. On 6 July 2017 she was called by coach Francisco Neto to represent Portugal at the UEFA Women's Euro 2017, the first time the Portugal national team qualified for a women's football major tournament.

Personal life
Costa played volleyball for her entire adolescence and she almost became a professional player. Costa is graduated in Sports science and has a Master's degree in her field of study.

References

External links
 
 
 
 Player's Profile at SC Braga

1994 births
Living people
Portugal women's international footballers
Portuguese women's footballers
Women's association football goalkeepers
Clube de Albergaria players
S.C. Braga (women's football) players
Campeonato Nacional de Futebol Feminino players
People from Nazaré, Portugal
Sportspeople from Leiria District
Boavista F.C. (women) players
UEFA Women's Euro 2022 players
UEFA Women's Euro 2017 players